Achelous (ancient Greek: Ἀχελῷος) is a river god in Greek mythology.

Achelous may also refer to:

rivers
 Achelous River, a river in western Greece
 Achelous River (Arcadia), a river in Arcadia, Greece
 Achelous River (Thessaly), a river in Thessaly, Greece
 Aheloy (river), a river in southeastern Bulgaria, known in Antiquity and the Middle Ages as Achelous
 Peiros, a river in Achaea, Greece, known in Antiquity as Achelous

other uses
 Achelous (crater), an impact crater on Ganymede
 Achelous-class repair ship, a class of ship built by the US Navy during World War II
 USS Achelous (ARL-1), a 1942 repair ship

See also
 Acheloos (disambiguation)